Shachar Sagiv (born 11 October 1994) is an Israeli triathlete. He competed in the men's event at the 2020 Summer Olympics. Sagiv also races in Super League Triathlon. In 2022, Sagiv won his first Super League Triathlon podium at SLT Malibu 2022.

References

External links
 
 

1994 births
Living people
Israeli male triathletes
Olympic triathletes of Israel
Triathletes at the 2020 Summer Olympics
Place of birth missing (living people)